Robert Horsfall may refer to:

 Robert Horsfall (stockbroker) (1807–1881)
 Robert Bruce Horsfall (1869–1948), American wildlife illustrator